This is a list of the Maryland state historical markers in Prince George's County.

This is intended to be a complete list of the official state historical markers placed in Prince George's County, Maryland by the Maryland Historical Trust (MHT). The locations of the historical markers, as well as the latitude and longitude coordinates as provided by the MHT's database, are included below. There are currently 59 historical markers located in Prince George's County.

References 

Prince George's County